Claye Michael Young (31 December 1964) is a former Australian cricketer, who played three first-class cricket matches for Tasmania in the 1987–88 season.

Young was a right-arm fast-medium bowler who performed well in the Tasmanian Grade Cricket competition, earning him a call up to the state side in 1987. Although performing well in one match, taking figures of 6/120 in one innings, he failed to cement a place in the side, and was not recalled.

He was born at Hobart in 1964 and is the older brother of Shaun Young who played over 100 first-class matches for Tasmania.

References

External links

1964 births
Australian cricketers
Tasmania cricketers
Living people